Bryotropha umbrosella is a moth of the family Gelechiidae. It is found in open dune areas throughout most of north-western Europe. In southern Europe, it is only known from one record from Spain.

They are known to have a wingspan is 9–11 mm. The forewings are blackish brown and the hindwings are pale fuscous, but darker towards the apex. Adults have been recorded on wing from late May to early August, probably in one generation per year.

Larvae live in a silken tube amongst Ceratodon purpureus. They have also been observed eating grass. The larvae have a pale brown to orange-brown body and brown head.

References

Moths described in 1839
umbrosella
Moths of Europe